Samuel Cromwell (died December 1, 1842) was a sailor and petty officer (boatswain's mate) aboard the brig USS Somers. Cromwell was feared by the young apprentices who made up the majority of the ship's crew, and was rumored to have served on a slaver at one time. These rumors lent credence to the idea that he would have been amenable to Philip Spencer's alleged plot to mutiny, kill the ship's officers and such of the crew as were not wanted and sail the Somers either as a pirate ship or a slaver.  

On the homeward leg of a voyage to Liberia, Cromwell was put in irons a few days after Spencer and Elisha Small, another sailor rumored to have been part of a slave ship's crew. After a meeting of the officers concluded that a mutinous plot existed, all three men were hanged without a court-martial.

References

1842 crimes in North America
1842 deaths
19th-century executions by the United States
19th-century executions of American people
Burials at sea
Extrajudicial killings
People executed by the United States military by hanging
People executed for mutiny
People who died at sea
United States Navy sailors
Year of birth missing